The Coconino Association for Vocations, Industry and Technology is a joint technological education district in Coconino County, Arizona. Established in 2001, it is one of Arizona's eleven such districts. It receives funding from the state and secondary property taxes in the association's five member districts: the Flagstaff Unified School District, Fredonia-Moccasin Unified School District, Grand Canyon Unified School District, Page Unified School District, and the Williams Unified School District.

External links
Official website

School districts in Coconino County, Arizona
2001 establishments in Arizona
School districts established in 2001